Spring Carousel: A Cancer Research Benefit is the 18th album by pianist George Winston and 14th solo piano album, released on March 31, 2017. While recuperating from myelodysplastic syndrome, Winston practiced the piano in the City of Hope Hospital auditorium, creating many 21 "kind of circular"  pieces, 15 of which ended up on Spring Carousel: A Cancer Research Benefit. Proceeds benefit City of Hope Hospital near Los Angeles.

Track listing 

Track 12, "Pixie #13 In C (Gôbajie)", originally appeared  on Gulf Coast Blues and Impressions: A Hurricane Relief Benefit.

Charts

References

External links
Liner Notes (PDF)

2010 albums
George Winston albums
Vince Guaraldi tribute albums
Dancing Cat Records albums
RCA Records albums